Shaun Lunt is aN English former professional rugby league footballer who last played as a  for the Batley Bulldogs in the Betfred Championship, and has played for England and the England Knights at international level.

Lunt played for the Castleford Tigers (Heritage № 835) in National League One, Workington Town in National League Two and the Huddersfield Giants in the Super League. He played on loan from Huddersfield at the Leeds Rhinos in the Super League. Lunt played for Hull Kingston Rovers, and on loan from Hull KR at the Leeds Rhinos in the Betfred Super League.

Background
Lunt was born in Cockermouth, Cumbria, England.

Career

Castleford Tigers
Lunt started his professional career at Castleford Tigers

Workington Town
Lunt then moved on to play for Workington Town.

Huddersfield Giants
Lunt joined Huddersfield in time for the 2009 Super League season. Lunt has made a promising start to life in Super League, scoring a try on his début, and adding four more in the first half of the season. On 10 May 2009, Lunt scored his first career hat-trick for Huddersfield in the Challenge Cup fourth round against Rochdale in a 38-12 victory.  He played in Huddersfield's 2009 Challenge Cup Final loss, scoring a try and having one disallowed in the process.

Leeds Rhinos
In 2012 he joined Leeds on a one-year loan.  Lunt played in the 2012 Challenge Cup Final defeat by the Warrington side at Wembley Stadium.
Lunt played in the 2012 Super League Grand Final victory over Warrington at Old Trafford.

Huddersfield Giants
Lunt returned from his loan spell with the Leeds club, and once again played for the Huddersfield side.

Hull Kingston Rovers
Lunt went on loan to Hull Kingston Rovers in 2015 and signed for them in 2016.  On 6 January 2017, it was revealed that Lunt would be captain of Hull Kingston Rovers for the 2017 season.  On 26 June 2019, Lunt re-joined the Leeds club on a deal until the end of the season, swapping with Matt Parcell who joined Hull Kingston Rovers

Batley Bulldogs
On 21 November 2019 it was announced that Lunt would join Batley for the 2020 season.

Barrow Raiders
It was announced on 12 August 2020 that Lunt would leave Batley to join Barrow for the 2021 season.

Without playing a game for new club Barrow, Lunt announced his retirement from rugby league on 27 Feb 2021

International career
Lunt represented England in 2010, and he played for the England Knights in 2012.

Style of play
Lunt was known for his great speed out of dummy half and accurate distribution, along with his sharp eye for the try-line, which led to many tries from dummy half in his career.

Honours

Club
Huddersfield
 Challenge Cup (1): 2009 Runner Up
 League Leaders' Shield (1): 2013

Leeds
 Super League (1): 2012
 Challenge Cup (1): 2012 Runner Up

Hull Kingston Rovers
 Challenge Cup (1): 2015 Runner Up

References

External links

Leeds Rhinos profile
Hull KR profile
Huddersfield Giants profile
SL profile
Leeds 34-18 Catalan (sic) Dragons

1987 births
Living people
Batley Bulldogs players
Barrow Raiders players
Castleford Tigers players
England Knights national rugby league team players
England national rugby league team players
English rugby league players
Huddersfield Giants players
Hull Kingston Rovers players
Leeds Rhinos players
Rugby league hookers
Rugby league players from Cockermouth
Workington Town players